Macronychia aurata is a species of satellite fly in the family Sarcophagidae.

References

Sarcophagidae
Articles created by Qbugbot
Insects described in 1902